Herbert Henry Johnson (10 August 1887 – 16 December 1947) was a British lightweight professional boxer who competed in the early twentieth century. He won a bronze medal in Boxing at the 1908 Summer Olympics losing against Frederick Spiller in the semi-finals.

References

External links
Harry Johnson's profile at Sports Reference.com

1887 births
1947 deaths
Boxers at the 1908 Summer Olympics
Lightweight boxers
Olympic boxers of Great Britain
Olympic bronze medallists for Great Britain
Olympic medalists in boxing
British male boxers
Medalists at the 1908 Summer Olympics